Príles is the local part of Trenčianska Teplá.

History 

The first mention comes from the 1351. Príles owning families: Prileszky, Hudcovics, Máriássy, Skrbenský...
In 1913, it joined nearly village Trenčianska Teplá.

Geography 
Located between the Dubnica nad Váhom and Trenčianska Teplá.

References 

Villages and municipalities in Trenčín District